Nand Lal Meena is former MLA from Kishanganj Constituency of Baran district Rajasthan. Born in 1936 in village Barlan, he graduated from Rajasthan University. He joined the Bharatiya Jana Sangh. He was later elected  MLA (1967-1972) from  Kishanganj Constituency of Rajasthan.

Reference 

1936 births
Living people